Studio 65 (Studiosessanta5) is an Italian architecture studio.

It was founded in 1965 in Turin as an avant-garde experimental collective of architects, designers, poets and artists. Its founders were Franco Audrito, Roberta Garosci, Enzo Bertone, Paolo Morello, and Paolo Rondelli. 

Studio 65 played an important role in the Radical movement in Italian design in 1960-70s. Some of the most famous products designed by them is the Bocca sofa and Capitello chair.  Other notable projects include the Leonardo sofa, which became one of the icons of the Radical Design movement, interior design of the Casa Canella apartment, the Palladian Villa, as well as the Barbarella night club. Other members of the Radical design movement from Turin were Piero Gatti-Cesare Paolini-Franco Teodoro, LIBIDARCH, Ceretti-Derossi-Rosso, Guido Drocco, Franco Mello, and Piero Gilardi.

Towards the end of the seventies the collective broke up and Audrito and Sampanitou - keeping the name Studio 65 - started an Architectural and design activity base in Arab countries, in parallel with a work of re-edition, rediscovery and contamination of some of the most iconic pieces of their production and creation of unique pieces, often produced in collaboration with iconic Made in Italy companies such as Gufram and Savio Firmino.
Currently the firm has offices in Turin, Jeddah, Riyad and Bali.

Bocca Sofa 
Bocca sofa was designed in 1970 as part of the project for a new fitness center in Milan, that Studio 65 was commissioned to complete. The sofa was a tribute to Salvador Dali's surrealistic portrait of Mae West. It was produced in soft polyurethane upholstered with fabric by Gufram, an Italian furniture manufacturer. The original name was Marilyn, and it was dedicated to Marilyn Monroe as well as the owner of the gym, Marilyn Garosci. According to one of its designers, Franco Audrito, the sofa "spoke out about our obsession with appearance." In 2004 it was introduced in Rotationally Molded Polyethylene with Heller Furniture. The Bocca sofa is still in production by Gufram and Heller Furniture

Capitello Chair 
The iconic Capitello Chair was created in 1971, and was also manufactured by Gufram.  Like most of the design objects created by Radical Design movement, they were controversial and provocative, aiming to destabilize expectations. As a marketing slogan, they used the statement "To sit on the past." As Maria Cristina Didero writes, "sitting on history" became a clear-cut statement that it was possible to break with traditions and the overwhelming weight of Modernism and to fight for your ideas via imaginative expression."

Marilyn/Bocca, Leonardo and Capitello are part of the Vitra Design Museum permanent collection..  And were included in the exhibition Pop Art Design by Vitra Design museum.

References 

Architecture firms of Italy
20th-century Italian architects